The PSL Footballer of the Year in South African football is awarded to the most outstanding player of the season across the domestic league, the South African Premier Division, and the three major cup competitions, the MTN 8, the Telkom Knockout and the Nedbank Cup.

See also
PSL Awards
PSL Player of the Season
PSL Players' Player of the Season
Lesley Manyathela Golden Boot

Premier Soccer League trophies and awards
Association football player of the year awards by competition
Annual events in South Africa